The Metapolitefsi ("regime change") was a period in modern Greek history from the fall of the Ioannides military junta of 1973–74 to the transition period shortly after the 1974 legislative elections.

The metapolitefsi was ignited by the liberalisation plan of military dictator Georgios Papadopoulos, which was opposed by prominent politicians such as Panagiotis Kanellopoulos and Stephanos Stephanopoulos, and halted by the massive Athens Polytechnic uprising against the military junta. The counter coup of Dimitrios Ioannides, and his coup d'etat against President of Cyprus Makarios III, which led to the Turkish invasion of Cyprus, brought the dictatorship down.

The appointment of the interim "national unity government", led by former prime minister Konstantinos Karamanlis, saw Karamanlis legalise the Communist Party (KKE) and found the center-right but still parliamentary (non-military) New Democracy party, which won the elections of 1974 by a landslide.

Background

Papadopoulos's failed liberalization process
Following a rigged referendum in late July 1973 that ratified the Greek Constitution of 1973 by a large majority, under which the Greek monarchy was abolished and Greece became a presidential republic, Georgios Papadopoulos, the head of the military junta that took power in 1967, became President of Greece. Soon after, in September 1973, Papadopoulos initiated an attempt at metapolitefsi or process of liberalisation, also known as the Markezinis Experiment, aiming to legitimize his government and rehabilitate its image as an international, and especially European, pariah after six years of dictatorship during which he appointed himself to a multitude of high-echelon government positions including Regent, Prime Minister, Minister for Defence, and Minister for the Interior. These excesses had the effect of further undermining his credibility and the seriousness of his regime both at home and abroad.<ref name="The Metapolitefsi that never was">Ioannis Tzortzis, University of Birmingham "The Metapolitefsi that Never Was: a Re-evaluation of the 1973 'Markezinis Experiment'" via the Internet ArchivePrimary link from LSE  quote: The Americans asked the Greek government to allow the use of their bases in Greek territory and air space to supply Israel; Markezinis, backed by Papadopoulos, denied on the grounds of maintaining good relations with the Arab countries. This denial is said to have turned the US against Papadopoulos and Markezinis. quote 2:Thus the students 'had been played straight into the hands of Ioannidis, who looked upon the coming elections with a jaundiced eye.. quote 3: The latter (editor's note: i.e. Markezinis) would insist until the end of his life that subversion on behalf..... ..Markezinis was known for his independence to the US interests quote 4: In that situation Ioannidis was emerging as a solution for the officers, in sharp contrast to Papadopoulos, whose accumulation 'of so many offices and titles (President of Republic, Prime Minister, minister of Defence) was harming the seriousness of the regime and giving it an unacceptable image, which was not left un-exploited by its opponents quote 5: The first attempt of Papadopoulos to start a process of reforma occurred in the spring of 1968. He was claiming that if the 'Revolution' stayed more than a certain time in power, it would lose its dynamics and transform into a 'regime,' which was not in his intentions. He tried to implicate Markezinis in the attempt; however, he met the stiff resistance of the hard-liners. Another attempt was again frustrated in the end of 1969 and the beginning of 1970; Papadopoulos was then disappointed and complaining 'I am being subverted by my fellow Evelpides cadets!' As a result of this second failure, he considered resigning in the summer of 1970, complaining that he lacked any support from other leading figures, his own closest followers included. But the rest of the faction leaders renewed their trust to him quote 6: Ioannidis said to Pattakos 'we are not playing. We shall have a dictatorship, send all our opponents to exile on the islands and stay in power for thirty years! quote 7 Conspiracies were already brewing by the time Markezinis was sworn in. quote 8 The 'Markezinis experiment' started among a climate of suspicion and distrust for Papadopoulos' intentions, reflecting the six-year isolation of the regime from the people; the soft-liners failed to gain any credibility with their attitudes in the civil society; quote 9 The date for the coup was set roughly around the 25th to 30th of November well before the Polytechnic events, and did not change because of them quote 10 ... democracy returned eight months later at the cost of thousands of dead and hundreds of thousands of homeless in Cyprus-developments which traumatised the Greek body politic for generations to come,....</ref> Feeling confident of his grasp on power, he requested the resignation of the 13 military men in his cabinet, dissolved the "revolutionary council" which had ruled Greece since the beginning of the coup, and appointed Spyros Markezinis as Prime Minister of Greece, entrusting him with the task of leading Greece to parliamentary rule. However, under the Greek Constitution of 1973, the presidential powers were far greater than those of the parliament."Past present" quote: October 9, 1973: ... Spyros Markezinis smiles as he takes the prime minister's position ... to the left of Archbishop Hieronymos ... after the swearing-in ceremony for his 39-member government, appointed by the then ruling military junta in a short-lived attempt to 'liberalise' its dictatorial regime through a tightly controlled transition to civilian rule. Hieronymos is flanked to his right by junta strongman, colonel George Papadopoulos as 'president of the republic', with his army colleague, general Odysseas Angelis, standing next to him as 'vice-president'. Under a new constitution passed by referendum on July 29, Papadopoulos lifted martial law, released all political prisoners and scrapped the military 'revolutionary council' which had governed Greece since the April 1967 coup d'etat, to woo old-guard politicians into endorsing his blueprint for 'liberalisation'. The leaders of outlawed political parties snubbed Papadopoulos's overtures because the new constitution allowed him to retain most of his dictatorial powers for another full seven-year term of his unelected 'presidency'. Markezinis was the only noteworthy veteran of the pre-1967 political establishment to accept the mandate of a caretaker premier ahead of parliamentary elections planned for late 1974. On November 25 he was unceremoniously toppled together with Papadopoulos by disaffected hardliners of the military regime under the shadowy leadership of brigadier Dimitris Ioannidis, head of the dreaded military police (ESA). A week earlier, Markezinis had humiliated himself by 'requesting' Papadopoulos to reimpose martial law in the wake of the November 17 uprising at the Athens Polytechnic Athens News, 4 October 2002 ATHENS NEWS , page: A11
Article code: C12982A112 via Internet Archive

Under the condition that Papadopoulos would curtail any military interference that could hinder the process, Spyros Markezinis was the only old guard politician prepared to assist in the controversial mission of helping the transition to some form of parliamentary rule. Having secured quasi-dictatorial presidential powers under the new constitution, Papadopoulos not only acquiesced but ordered a wide range of liberalisation measures, including the abolition of martial law, the easing of censorship and the release of all political prisoners. Even the long banned music of Mikis Theodorakis was allowed back in the airwaves. The lifting of censorship, "created a positive political and cultural climate that allowed comfortable margins for the pluralistic circulation of ideas". Scores of new publications were produced that covered a wide ideological spectrum, and the main issues of the era such as the Vietnam War, the Cultural Revolution, the Sino-Soviet split, the death of Che Guevara, and the 1968 student protests in France and Italy were widely covered. This had the effect of bringing a wide segment of the Greek youth "into contact with the most significant works of historical and contemporary Marxist, anarchist, and Bourgeois radical thought".

Ostensibly free elections were announced soon after to be held in 1974, in which political formations including part of the traditional left, but not the Communist Party of Greece (which was banned during the Greek Civil War), were expected to participate.

Papadopoulos failed to convince the better part of the old political elite, including politicians such as Panagiotis Kanellopoulos, Stephanos Stephanopoulos, to participate in his liberalisation attempt. Most old guard politicians could not condone the fact that some of their colleagues were to remain excluded from the political process. Moreover, they were opposed to the concentration of powers delegated to the President,  and resented having been demonised by Papadopoulos's junta as palaiokommatistes (meaning antiquated party men) during the previous six years. In fact Kanellopoulos, who was Prime Minister of Greece when deposed by the 1967 junta,  remained vehemently opposed to any form of cooperation with the regime throughout the dictatorship years.

 1973 Athens Polytechnic Uprising 
A transition from one form of government to another, especially from dictatorship to democracy, is typically difficult and fraught with uncertainty and anxiety for the country that undertakes it.  Greece's transition was no different as the military, political elites and students sought to affirm their respective positions in society. In particular, the student movement in Greece had been repressed by the dictatorship and student activists were marginalised and suppressed in the name of anti-communism. Early student activism during the dictatorship included the self-immolation in 1970 of Geology student Kostas Georgakis in Genoa, Italy, in protest against the junta. His action served to demonstrate the depth of the resistance and resentment against the regime.

Student activism in Greece was traditionally strong and, unlike in some dictatorships where democracy was a distant dream, had a long and established record of action in democratic times and, more important, it possessed the memory of past democratic action. In addition, the stiff constraints imposed by the rigid and artificial Papadopoulos transition upon the democratic body politic of Greece antagonised not only the politicians but also the intelligentsia, whose primary exponents were the students.

Not unexpectedly, in November 1973 the Athens Polytechnic uprising broke out starting with the usual student protest tactics such as building occupations and radio broadcasts. The student uprising is believed to have been spontaneous, and not orchestrated by any particular political group in Greece. In fact, a smaller uprising had preceded it two weeks earlier at the Athens Law School and it was still active even as events at the Polytechnic were unfolding.

Unlike a previous strike in the Athens law school in February 1973, prior to their liberalisation attempt, where the regime negotiated at length with the students and bloodshed was avoided, in November 1973 the regime made no attempt to negotiate with the students. At the same time the students taking part in the smaller law school demonstration moved into the Polytechnic, as the events there gathered momentum.

In normal (democratic) times, such a protest might have been defused using tactics based on usual historical precedents such as negotiations with student leaders, and failing that, resorting to using normal crowd control methods followed by more negotiations, as the regime had done with the law students some weeks before.

However, this student protest happened in the middle of the uncertain political experiment of transition from dictatorship to democracy. Given that the main engineer of the transition, Papadopoulos, did not have much experience in democratic transitions, his liberalisation plan was derailed as students, and, later, workers, used the liberalisation to start their uprising, which forced the Papadopoulos regime to clamp-down hard on the protests, a move that discredited the very liberalisation Papadopoulos was trying to implement.

In failing to negotiate, the junta made martyrs out of the Polytechnic students. This in turn gave the student protest momentum and it eventually evolved into a near-universal demonstration against the dictatorship. At that point, the transitional government panicked, sending a tank crashing through the gates of the Athens Polytechnic. Soon after that, Markezinis himself had the humiliating task of requesting Papadopoulos to re-impose martial law. The student protests were the first sign that Papadopoulos's attempt at "liberalisation" in Greece had begun to fail.

The inherent contradictions of the coup, carefully suppressed during the dictatorship, became much more visible during the regime's attempt at democratisation.Eleftherotypia  quote: "Παρατηρείται, λοιπόν, το πρώτο εννιάμηνο του 1968, από την ανάληψη της πρωθυπουργίας από τον Γεώργιο Παπαδόπουλο μέχρι το «δημοψήφισμα» για το νέο Σύνταγμα τον Σεπτέμβριο, μια βαθιά ρήξη στους κόλπους της χούντας που αφορά τον προσανατολισμό της «επανάστασης»." Translation: "It is observed therefore that in the first nine months of 1968, from the acceptance of the Prime Ministership by Papadopoulos until the "plebiscite" for the new constitution in September, a deep schism in the junta circles [develops] which concerns the direction of the "revolution""Backup from Internet ArchiveΑΝΟΔΟΣ ΚΑΙ ΠΑΡΑΚΜΗ ΤΗΣ ΕΛΛΗΝΙΚΗΣ ΑΣΤΙΚΗΣ ΔΗΜΟΚΡΑΤΙΑΣ  (Rise and decline of Democracy: online article) In its strident anti-communism, the junta was opposed by large sections of Greek society which wished to overcome the trauma of the Greek Civil War. Papadopoulos had to be divisive and anti-communist from the beginning because otherwise his coup d'état would not have made sense and now his attempt at metapolitefsi was being derailed, partially, because of that."Thirty years ago ...", Athens News, 2 July 2004 quote 1: On the night of July 23, 1974, a military dictatorship that had ruled the country with its iron fist for more than seven years, collapsed, paving the way for the bloodless restoration of democracy in its birthplace. It was a catharsis of sorts to a modern Greek drama quote 2 A disastrous civil war in the 40s and an impaired democracy that since then had nourished the colonels-turned-dictators who killed it in 1967 were left behind the line. ATHENS NEWS , 02/07/2004 page: A06
Article code: C13073A061 via the Internet archive

The events at Athens Polytechnic unfolded precisely as the dictatorship's more staunch members had hoped. Brigadier Dimitrios Ioannides, leader of a junta within the junta, was disdainful of Papadopoulos, his perceived move to democracy, and his pursuit of a foreign policy more independent of the United States.

The conditions for Papadopoulos's overthrow by Ioannides became easier because Papadopoulos would not believe Markezinis and others in his circle when warned about Ioannides's plans to overthrow him. In fact Papadopoulos's reply to Markezinis was: "Mimis [nickname for Dimitrios, Ioannides's first name] is an "Arsakeiás", he would never do something like that". "Arsakeiás", in Greek, is a female student of the Arsakeio, a strict all-female school in Athens in Papadopoulos's time, and a metaphor for a "quiet, shy girl".

1973 Ioannides Counter Coup
Ioannides, a disaffected hardliner and a man with an established anti-democratic record, seized the opportunity. On 25 November 1973 he used the uprising as a pretext to stage a counter coup that overthrew Papadopoulos and put an abrupt end to Markezinis's attempt at transition to democratic rule. In fact, his coup was planned months prior to the events at the Polytechnic.

Ioannides's involvement in inciting unit commanders of the security forces to commit criminal acts during the Athens Polytechnic uprising, so that he could facilitate his upcoming coup, was noted in the indictment presented to the court by the prosecutor during the junta trials and in his subsequent conviction in the Polytechneion trial where he was found to have been morally responsible for the events.

During the Ioannides coup the radio broadcasts, following the now familiar coup in progress scenario featuring martial music interspersed with military orders and curfew announcements, kept repeating that the army was taking back the reins of power in order to save the principles of the 1967 revolution and that the overthrow of the Papadopoulos-Markezinis government was supported by the army, navy and air force.

At the same time they announced that the new coup was a "continuation of the revolution of 1967" and accused Papadopoulos with "straying from the ideals of the 1967 revolution" and "pushing the country towards parliamentary rule too quickly".

Ioannides proceeded to arrest Markezinis and Papadopoulos, cancelled the elections that were planned for 1974, reinstated martial law, and appointed a puppet government headed by old junta member General Phaedon Gizikis as the new president, and civilian, and old Papadopoulos junta cabinet member, Adamantios Androutsopoulos as the prime minister.

Unlike Papadopoulos, Ioannides was not particularly concerned with legal or democratic processes. He was prepared for a dictatorship of thirty or more years.  Being a more orthodox dictator and thinking in simpler terms than Papadopoulos, he solved the dilemma on how to achieve a democratic transition by dropping the plan completely.

Prior to seizing power, Ioannides preferred to work in the background and never held any formal office in the junta government. Reflecting his penchant for secrecy, the press described him as the invisible dictator. Now he ruled Greece from the shadows, and was the de facto leader of a puppet regime composed by members some of whom were rounded up by ESA soldiers in roving jeeps to serve and others that were simply chosen by mistake.Mario Modiano ('The Times' correspondent in Athens), "A long, happy summer night 30 years ago", Athens News, 23 July 2004 quote1: My friend had been sworn in as a minister by mistake. After his coup, Ioannides dispatched military policemen in jeeps to round up the people he needed to man a puppet government. When they turned up at my friend's home and ordered him to follow them, he was convinced that the soldiers intended to shoot him. quote 2: The meeting lasted five hours. Then there was a break, and by the time the meeting resumed, Evangelos Averoff, the former foreign minister, who was there, had already telephoned Constantine Karamanlis in Paris to urge him to return immediately and assume the reins of power. article code: C13076A061 via Internet Archive Adamantios Androutsopoulos, the new junta prime minister, was described as a political non-entity by the New York Times. Despite its doubtful origins, the new junta pursued an aggressive internal crackdown and an expansionist foreign policy.

At his frequent press conferences during his rule, Papadopoulos often used the patient in a cast analogy to describe his assault on the body politic of Greece. He usually answered questions on the topic of democratic transition from the press by referring to the patient analogy in a humorous and jovial manner. He used to say that he put the patient (Greece) in a cast ("ασθενή στον γύψο" literally: patient in gypsum) so that he could fix her skeletal (implying political) structure. Typically the "doctor" had to operate on the "patient" by  putting restraints on the "patient", tying him on a surgical bed to perform the "operation" so that the life of the "patient" would not be "endangered" during the operation. This analogy aside, Papadopoulos at least indicated his intention of ending military rule once the political system had recovered to his satisfaction and that the treatment would progress on some legal and political basis.

In fact Papadopoulos had indicated as early as 1968 that he was eager for a reform process and even tried to contact Markezinis at the time. He then repeatedly attempted to initiate reforms in 1969 and 1970, only to be thwarted by the hardliners including Ioannides. In fact subsequent to his 1970 failed attempt at reform, he threatened to resign and was dissuaded only after the hardliners renewed their personal allegiance to him.

In contrast, Ioannides did not talk to the press and did not offer any analogies for his proposed treatment. But through his actions one can determine that the cast analogy did not serve his purposes any longer. Ioannides therefore abandoned the patient in a cast analogy that Papadopoulos offered in order to make a political statement that no democratic transition would take place during his tenure in power. This also indicated that Ioannides was not concerned about legal formalities. He was a "ruthless dictator who toppled the [Papadopoulos] junta for being too liberal". Ioannidis was considered a "purist and a moralist, a type of Greek Gaddafi". At the time, Time magazine had described Ioannides  as "a rigid, puritanical xenophobe – he has never been outside Greece or Cyprus – who might try to turn Greece into a European equivalent of Muammar Gaddafi's Libya."

 EAT/ESA torture of dissenters

Ioannides's junta moved quickly to stifle any dissent, re-instituting and accelerating repressive measures such as censorship, expulsions, arbitrary detentions and torture, described as among the harshest ever imposed in Greece, and earning the junta an international reputation as a police state. Ioannides's main instrument of terror, was the Greek Military Police (EAT/ESA''', Greek: ΕΑΤ/ΕΣΑ: Ειδικόν Ανακριτικόν Τμήμα Ελληνικής Στρατιωτικής Αστυνομίας translated as: Special Interrogation Section of the Greek Military Police)."Past present", Athens News, 2 May 2003 quote: After weeks of gruesome interrogation in the infamous military police (ESA) torture chambers, Panagoulis was sentenced to death by a court martial on 17 November 1968. Article by Dimitris Yannopoulos ATHENS NEWS , 02/05/2003, page: A13
Article code: C13012A131 via the Internet archive The EAT/ESA torture centre in Athens has been described as the "place that made Greece tremble". The EAT/ESA could arrest anyone, even superior officers, which generated the popular saying: "Any ESA man is equal to a major in the army". Even Papadopoulos, who in 1969 signed the law which gave "extraordinary legal powers" to ESA, had them used against him in 1973 during Ioannides's coup. Artists, painters, intellectuals who had publicly expressed anti-junta sentiments or created a work that criticised the junta, were remanded to EAT/ESA centres, used to intimidate dissidents, and spread fear of dissent.

People were held incommunicado without EAT/ESA notifying anyone for weeks or months on end and were only allowed limited communication thereafter with their families through the Greek Red Cross. Loud music blared from the detention centres in order to suppress the screams of the victims."Reportage without frontiers from ET (Greek National TV) (translation by Google) Original link through Internet Archive Interview with Vice Admiral Konstantinos Dimitriadis quote: The fai (editor's note:food) was filled with salt. Απειλές. Threats. Ορισμένοι μάλιστα υπέστησαν κι απειλές ηθικής τάξεως. Some even suffered threats and Ethic (editor's note: Indecent threats). Ότι οι γυναίκες τους και τα λοιπά και κάτι μονταρισμένες φωτογραφίες με σκάνδαλα να το πούμε έτσι. That women and the other something mounted photos with scandals to say (editor's note: Falsified pictures depicting prisoners' wives involved in morally scandalous behaviour). Με απειλές, με τέτοια πράγματα και υβρεολόγιο. With threats, with such things and profanity. Νυχθημερόν να παίζει κάποιο ραδιόφωνο. Nychthimeron (ed note: Day and night the radio was playing) to play a radio. Ένα ραδιόφωνο με διάφορα τραγούδια εκείνης της εποχής και τα λοιπά. A radio with various songs of the time and so on. Και μαγνητόφωνα με κραυγές για να σπάσει το ηθικό, ας πούμε. And tape with cries to break the morale, say. (Editor's note: Tapes with screams to break the morale of the prisoners) Αυτά και βέβαια ορισμένοι, δεν υπέστησαν όλοι με τον ίδιο τρόπο την μείωση αυτή. Those are certainly some, not all were in the same way to reduce this. (Editor's note: Not all prisoners suffered this on the same level) Είχανε κάτι ζωστήρες. Eichane zostires something (editor's note: They had belts (for beating)). Το κορύφωμα βέβαια ήταν του Μουστακλή ο οποίος χτυπήθηκε άσχημα και βγήκε εκτός ο άνθρωπος. The culmination of the course was Moustaklis who severely beaten and got out of the man. Editor's note: The worst was Moustaklis who was beaten so badly he went mad (Translation by Google  with editor's notes for clarification)Original Greek interview from the rwf archive through the Internet Archive Torture techniques included  sleep deprivation, starvation, beatings, and psychological blackmail involving family members. The intensity of violence was such that brain injuries could result after the torture sessions, as experienced by Greek Army Major Spyros Moustaklis, who partially paralyzed and unable to speak for the rest of his life after 47 days of torture.

 1974 failed Cypriot coup 

Having successfully terrorised the population, the "junta nova" tried to realise its foreign policy ambitions by launching a military coup against President Makarios III of Cyprus. Gizikis, as usual, obliged by issuing the order for the coup on Ioannides's behalf.

Makarios was at the time both Archbishop and President of Cyprus. He was deposed by military coup on 15 July 1974 and replaced by Nikos Sampson. However the coup backfired as Turkey reacted with Operation Atilla on 20 July; the Turkish invasion of Cyprus had begun.

This military and political disaster for Greece and Cyprus led to thousands of dead and hundreds of thousands of Greek-Cypriot refugees, deeply traumatised the Greek body politic for the long term and was the final straw for Ioannides who had already instigated or participated in three coups in seven years — a record in modern Greek history — with catastrophic results for both countries.

 1974 Post-invasion paralysis 

Immediately after the Turkish invasion of Cyprus the dictators, not expecting such a disastrous outcome, finally decided that Ioannides's approach was catastrophic for the interests of the country.
The complete rationale for their subsequent actions, even to this day, is not known. Analysis of their motives can improve with time as new details come to the fore but it appears that the junta members realised that the Androutsopoulos government could not deal effectively with the dual crises of the Cyprus conflict and the economy. Androutsopoulos, described as a political non-entity, did not have the clout to effectively negotiate an honourable end to the Cyprus crisis. It is reported that President Gizikis finally realised the need for a strong government which could effectively negotiate an end to the Cyprus conflict.

In the early hours of the Cyprus crisis, indications of panic and indecision in the junta government were manifestly evident from the reaction of the Greek public as they raided supermarkets and grocery stores all over Greece, fearing an all out war with Turkey and sensing the inability of the junta to govern, as well as the anxious attempts of the junta members to communicate with and surrender power to the very same members of the democratic Establishment of Greece that they had demonised and maligned as palaiokommatistes  (meaning old party system men) throughout the dictatorship.

They had also worked hard during their seven years in power to create a New Greece (Νέα Ελλάδα) under the slogan of Ellas Ellinon Christianon (translated as Greece of the Christian Greeks) completely devoid of any link with the old party system and its politicians.<ref name="Past Present, 22 July 2005">"Past present", Athens News, 22 July 2005 quote:  Greece's seven-year military rule collapsed under the weight of its disastrous blunders...  Early in the morning of July 24, general Faedon Gizikis, the figurehead 'president' of the then ruling junta faction headed by reclusive military police chief, brigadier-general Dimitris Ioannides, invited former politicians of the pre-junta era for consultations on the army's intention to hand over power to a civilian government comprising top cadres from the traditional centre and right. The news of the handover plans sparked nationwide enthusiasm as the military rulers had set the country on a war footing in the wake of a full-scale Turkish invasion of Cyprus on July 20, ostensibly provoked by a pro-junta coup in Nicosia which toppled the island-republic's president, Archbishop Makarios. Battles were still raging in the island's north when Greeks took to the streets in all the major cities, celebrating the junta's decision to step down before the war in Cyprus could spill over across the Aegean. But talks in Athens were going nowhere with Gizikis's offer of the mandate to form a government to Panayiotis Kanellopoulos, the last civilian prime minister before the April 1967 army coup. That is when Evangelos Averoff, a close aide of Karamanlis, suggested that only the former rightwing leader could take charge of the domestic situation and negotiate a ceasefire in Cyprus. Averoff knew that Karamanlis was already on his way, and cheering Athenian crowds chanted 'Here he comes!' Article by Dimitris Yannopoulos, 22/07/2005 article code: C13140A171 via Internet archive</ref> Now they were ready to relinquish this vision to that same old guard they had maligned as obsolete old party system men.

This paradox is at the centre of the phenomenon known as Metapolitefsi. There are two possible considerations which could assist in resolving this paradox. First, due to the risk of imminent war with Turkey there was no room for negotiations during the transition from military to political rule. Second reason was that since the military failed in the one  area they were supposed to be competent by showing inadequate organisation during war preparations and ultimately failing to  protect Cyprus from the invasion, they also lost what remained of their political clout and thus they were unable to resist the demands of the politicians. The second paradox was Karamanlis's slow response in cleansing the military from the junta elements. Although the army was politically very weak at the time, Karamalis proceeded with great caution in eliminating junta supporters still remaining within the military. The second paradox can be explained by the fact that at the time, due to the Cyprus crisis, Karamanlis did not want to proceed with measures that would lower the morale of the army, and thus weaken the military, at a time of crisis with Turkey.

 The junta relinquishes power  

Following the Cyprus invasion by the Turks, the dictators ultimately abandoned Ioannides and his policies. On 23 July 1974, President Gizikis called a meeting of old guard politicians, including Panagiotis Kanellopoulos, Spyros Markezinis, Stephanos Stephanopoulos, Evangelos Averoff and others. The heads of the armed forces also participated in the meeting. The agenda was to appoint a national unity government with the mandate to lead the country to elections and at the same time to honourably extricate Greece from an armed confrontation with Turkey. Gizikis proposed, at first, that the key ministries of Defence, Public Order, and the Interior be controlled by the military — but this idea was summarily rejected.

Former Prime Minister Panagiotis Kanellopoulos was originally suggested as the head of the new interim government. He was the legitimate Prime Minister originally deposed by the dictatorship and a distinguished veteran politician who had repeatedly criticised Papadopoulos and his successor. Raging battles were still taking place in Cyprus' north and Greece's border with Turkey in Thrace was tense when Greeks took to the streets in all the major cities, celebrating the junta's decision to relinquish power before the war in Cyprus could spill all over the Aegean. But talks in Athens were going nowhere with Gizikis's offer to Panayiotis Kanellopoulos to form a government.

Nonetheless, after all the other politicians departed without reaching a decision, Evangelos Averoff remained in the meeting room. He telephoned Karamanlis in Paris to appraise him of the developments and urge him to return to Greece, and, following the call, further engaged Gizikis. He insisted that Constantine Karamanlis, prime minister of Greece from 1955 to 1963, was the only political personality who could lead a successful transition government, taking into consideration the new circumstances and dangers both inside and outside the country. Gizikis and the heads of the armed forces initially expressed reservations, but they finally became convinced by Averoff's arguments. Admiral Arapakis was the first, among the participating military leaders, to express his support for Karamanlis. After Averoff's decisive intervention, Gizikis phoned Karamanlis at his Paris apartment and begged him to return. Karamanlis initially hesitated but Gizikis  pledged to him that the military would no longer interfere in the political affairs of Greece. Other junta members joined Gizikis in his pledge.

Throughout his stay in France, Karamanlis was a thorn at the side of the junta because he possessed the credibility and popularity they lacked both in Greece and abroad and he also criticised them often.

Upon news of his impending arrival cheering Athenian crowds took to the streets chanting: "Ερχεται! Ερχεται!" "Here he comes! Here he comes!" Similar celebrations broke out all over Greece. Athenians in the tens of thousands also went to the airport to greet him.Nick Michaelian, "The real unsung heroes", Athens News, 16 July 2004. Thousands went to the airport to greet him., page: A04
Article code: C13075A041 via the Internet Archive

Karamanlis sworn in

On 23 July 1974 Karamanlis returned to Athens on the French President's Mystère 20 jet made available to him by President Valéry Giscard d'Estaing, a close personal friend. At 4 a.m. on 24 July 1974, Karamanlis was sworn-in as Prime Minister of Greece by Archbishop Seraphim of Athens, with Gizikis attending the ceremony. Subsequently, Gizikis remained temporarily in power for legal continuity reasons.Athens News on Metapolitefsi 

Despite being faced with an inherently unstable and dangerous political situation, which forced him to sleep aboard a yacht watched over by a naval destroyer for several weeks after his return, Karamanlis moved swiftly to defuse the tension between Greece and Turkey, which came on the brink of war over the Cyprus crisis, and begin the process of transition from military rule to a pluralist democracy.

 Metapolitefsi 

 Strategy of democratization 
The events that led to metapolitefsi and the traditional weaknesses of the Greek political and social institutions were not conducive to a comprehensive strategy towards democracy. The civil society was not prepared to articulate a transition strategy "from below" and the groups of resistance were fragmented, despite their political glamor. Therefore the transition process became a "from above" project, whose weight had to fall on the shoulders of Karamanlis.

Karamanlis first legalised the Communist Party of Greece (KKE) that was constantly demonised by the junta, using this political move as a differentiator between the junta rigidity on the matter that betrayed its totalitarianism and his own realpolitik approach honed by years of practicing democracy. The legalization of the Communist Party was also meant as a gesture of political inclusionism and rapprochement. At the same time Karamanlis also freed all political prisoners  and pardoned all political crimes against the junta. This approach was warmly received by the people, long weary of junta divisive polemics. Following through with his reconciliation theme he also adopted a measured approach to removing collaborators and appointees of the dictatorship from the positions they held in government bureaucracy, and, wanting to officially inaugurate the new democratic era in Greek politics as soon as possible, declared that elections would be held in November 1974, a mere four months after the collapse of the Régime of the Colonels. In addition, Karamanlis wanted to differentiate between the far-right, which was discredited by its association with the junta, and the legitimate political right. The trials of the junta and the subsequent severe sentences on the principal junta members were a strong sign that the parliamentary right disapproved of power usurpation by using extra-constitutional methods. At the same time, Karamanlis withdrew from the military portion of NATO and raised questions about the military bases of the United States in Greece, sending a strong signal that Greece's hitherto strongly pro-Western-alliance orientation should not be assumed as a given any longer, and to indicate Greece's displeasure with the inaction of its allies during the Turkish invasion of Cyprus. Karamanlis also signaled the weakening of Greece's dependence on the US by prioritising the ascension of Greece to the European Union, which was frozen during the junta years, and succeeding. His slogan during his campaign to promote Greece's membership in the European Union was "Greece belongs to the West".

The relatively short duration of the Greek dictatorship compared to its Spanish and Portuguese counterparts which had lasted for decades, facilitated a quick transition to democratic rule. The Cyprus disaster also empowered the democratic forces, including the democratic officers in the Greek army who contributed to the democratisation of the armed forces post-metapolitefsi. Karamanlis's government nullified the 1968 junta constitution and replaced it with the basic law of 1952 modified with the provision that the appointment of military leaders in strategic positions was to be carried-out by civilian rule. In the legislative election of November 1974, Karamanlis with his newly formed conservative party, not coincidentally named New Democracy (Νέα Δημοκρατία, transliterated in English as Nea Demokratia) obtained a massive parliamentary majority and was elected Prime Minister. The elections were soon followed by the 1974 plebiscite on the abolition of the monarchy and the establishment of the Third Hellenic Republic.

In January 1975 the junta members were formally arrested and in early August of the same year the government of Konstantinos Karamanlis brought charges of high treason and mutiny against Georgios Papadopoulos and nineteen other co-conspirators of the military junta. The mass trial, described as "Greece's Nuremberg", took place at the Korydallos Prison under heavy security and was televised. One thousand soldiers armed with submachine guns provided security. The roads leading to the jail were patrolled by tanks. Papadopoulos and Ioannides were sentenced to death for high treason. These sentences were later commuted to life imprisonment by the Karamanlis government. This trial was followed by a second trial which centered around the events of the Athens Polytechnic uprising.

A plan to grant amnesty to the junta principals by the Konstantinos Mitsotakis government in 1990 was cancelled after protests from conservatives, socialists and communists. Papadopoulos died in hospital in 1999 after being transferred from Korydallos while Ioannides remained incarcerated until his death in 2010.

The adoption of the Constitution of 1975 by the newly elected Hellenic Parliament solemnised the new era of democratic governance. The parliamentary committee that proposed the draft constitution was presided by Constantine Tsatsos, an Academician, former minister and close friend of Karamanlis, who served as the first elected President of Greece (after metapolitefsi) from 1975 to 1980.

 First years after transition 

Karamanlis's New Democracy went on to comfortably win the first post-junta free elections in 1974 with 220 seat out of 300, with Centre Union gaining 60 seats, Andreas Papandreou's Panhellenic Socialist Movement (PASOK) 12, while the United Left entered parliament with 8 seats. Karamanlis's big win in 1974 demonstrated a great change in Greek politics, without giving cause for action to the relatively inactive, but still dangerous junta elements. Three years later, with the 1974 crisis farther in the background, New Democracy's comfortable margin was reduced in the 1977 Greek legislative election, due to an increasing shift in Greek politics toward the left. Karamanlis continued to serve as Prime Minister until 10 May 1980, when he succeeded Tsatsos as President of Greece and then cohabited for four years (1981–1985) with his fierce political opponent and leader PASOK, the Greek socialist party, prime minister Andreas Papandreou.

The political and social views expounded by PASOK were in antithesis to the center-right policies followed by the conservative government of ND (1974–1981). According to Ino Afentouli, the political expression of the metapolitefsi, namely the coming to power of a conservative leader such as Karamanlis, did not correspond to the changes which had in the meantime befallen Greek society. Thereby, this current often opposed ND's governments, disdained the old centrist political elite expressed by Center Union – New Forces (and its leader Georgios Mavros) and prompted the rise to power of PASOK and Papandreou in the elections of 1981. Since 1974 Papandreou challenged  Karamanlis's choices and objected to his dominant role in defining post-1974 democracy, while other political forces of the opposition, such as Center Union – New Forces and EDA occasionally offered him an inconsistent support, especially during 1974–1977.

In the elections of 1981 Papandreou used as slogan the catchword change (Greek: αλλαγή''). Some analysts, including Afentouli, regard PASOK's victory under Papandreou as a culmination  of the metapolitefsi of 1974, given that the fall of the junta had not been accompanied by the rise of new political powers, but rather by the resumption of power by the old guard politicians.

However Karamanlis is acknowledged for his successful restoration of Democracy and the  repair of the two great national schisms by first legalising the communist party and by establishing the system of presidential democracy in Greece. His successful prosecution of the junta during the junta trials and the heavy sentences imposed on the junta principals also sent a message to the army that the era of immunity from constitutional transgressions by the military was over. Karamanlis's policy of European integration is also acknowledged to have ended the paternalistic relation between Greece and the United States.

See also 
 Spanish transition to democracy
 Portuguese transition to democracy

Citations and notes

External links 

History of modern Greece
1974 in Greece
Democratization
Political history of Greece
Greek junta
1974 in politics